The Ministry of Foreign Affairs (MFA; , KHELN), formerly known as the Ministry of Foreign Affairs and Trade (MOFAT), is the cabinet-level ministry in the government of Brunei which is responsible for handling Brunei's external relations, the management of its international diplomatic missions and the nation's foreign trade policy. It was established immediately upon Brunei's independence on 1 January 1984. It is currently led by a minister and a second minister, in which the incumbents are Hassanal Bolkiah, the Sultan of Brunei, and Erywan Yusof respectively. The ministry is headquartered in Bandar Seri Begawan.

History

From 1888 until 1984, Brunei was a protectorate under British rule, but the nation began the foundations of a foreign ministry by creating a Diplomatic Service Department. After achieving full independence from the United Kingdom in January 1984, Brunei immediately established an independent foreign ministry, then known as the Ministry of Foreign Affairs.

In 2005, the government merged the ministry with the former International Relations and Trade Department of the Ministry of Industry and Primary Resources. The addition of "Foreign Trade" to the ministry's official name was made to reflect the full scope of its responsibilities. From 2005 until 2018, Lim Jock Seng was the Second Minister of Foreign Affairs & Trade. The current Second Minister is Erywan Yusof.

Budget 
In the fiscal year 2022–23, the ministry has been allocated with a budget of B$127 million, a 4.3 percent increase from the previous year.

Ministers

First Minister

Second Minister

See also
 Foreign relations of Brunei
 Diplomatic missions of Brunei

Notes

References

External links
 

Foreign Affairs
Government agencies established in 1984
Brunei